The architecture of Iraq encompasses the buildings of various architectural styles that exist in Iraq.

Mesopotamian

Islamic 

Islamic architecture would flourish during the Umayyad, Abbasid, and Ottoman periods.

Early Caliphate

Under Early Caliphs buildings and Mosques were built. The city of Basra was founded by caliph Omar. 

Kufa was also founded by Omar and given its name in 637–638 CE, about the same time as Basra. The region of Iraq was the important Military base of early Caliphate

Umayyad architecture

Umayyad architecture developed in the Umayyad Caliphate between 661 and 750, primarily in its heartlands of Syria, Palestine and Iraq.

The Umayyad caliphate was established in 661, when Caliph Hasan abdicated to Muawiyah ibn Abi Sufyan, founder of the Umayyad dynasty. Muawiyah I, governor of Syria, became the first Umayyad caliph. Under the Umayyads the Arab empire continued to expand, eventually extending to Central Asia and the borders of India in the east, Yemen in the south, the Atlantic coast of what is now Morocco and the Iberian peninsula in the west. The Umayyads built new cities, often unfortified military camps that provided bases for further conquests. Wasit in Iraq was the most important of these, and included a square Friday mosque with a hypostyle roof.

Abbasid architecture

In the mid 8th century, the Round city of Baghdad was founded as the Abbasid capital, following the Abbasid victory over the Umayyad caliphate. While the Umayyads had typically reused pre-Islamic buildings in the cities they had conquered, by the Abbasid era many of these structures required replacement. Abbasids founded many cities throughout the Empire. In 836 Samarra was founded. The core area of the city was initially constructed in the reign of al-Mu'tasim, with further development taking place under al-Wathiq and al-Mutawakkil.

Ottoman 
The Al-Wazeer Mosque, Al-Maqam Mosque, are examples of Ottoman architecture in Iraq.

Modern

Kingdom of Iraq 
In the 1950s, as Iraq became wealthier due to oil revenue during the reign of King Faisal II, several important projects were commissioned. Numerous foreign architects, including Walter Groupius and Le Corbusier were invited to Iraq to design various public buildings during this period. Among these was American architect Frank Lloyd Wright, who drew up the Plan for Greater Baghdad, which would include a cultural center, opera house, and university on the outskirts of Baghdad. However, it was never built due to the collapse of the monarchy in 1958.

Post 1958 
During his tenure as President, Saddam Hussein oversaw the construction of several monuments and palaces, including the Victory Arch and al Faw Palace. Many of these have been described as tacky, and unrepresentative of actual Iraqi architectural tradition.

References

Bibliography 
 
 
 

Architecture in Iraq